Christopher or Chris Leonard may refer to:

Chris Leonard, footballer
Christopher Leonard (author)
Chris Leonard (singer)
Christopher Leonard (rower) represented United States at the 2013 Summer Universiade
Chris Leonard, songwriter and member of pop punk band Son of Dork
Chris Leonard (Disc Golfer and Tournament Director)

References